Thomas or Tom Brennan may refer to:

Thomas Brennan (Irish Land League) (1853–1912), Irish politician
Thomas Brennan (Fianna Fáil politician) (1886–1953), Irish politician
Thomas Brennan (Victorian state politician) (1900–1966), Victorian state MP
Thomas Brennan (footballer) (1911–?), Scottish professional footballer
Thomas Brennan (equestrian) (1940–2014), Irish equestrian
Thomas E. Brennan (1929–2018), American jurist, Chief Justice of the Michigan Supreme Court
Thomas Francis Brennan (1855–1916), American Catholic bishop; 1st Catholic bishop of Dallas 1891–1893
Tom Brennan (politician) (1866–1944), Australian Senator
Tom Brennan (basketball, born 1930) (1930–1990), basketball player for Villanova University and the Philadelphia Warriors
Tom Brennan (basketball, born 1949) (born 1949), American sportscaster and former University of Vermont basketball coach
Tom Brennan (baseball) (born 1952), 1980s baseball player
Tom Brennan (civil servant) (1928–2013), Oklahoma civil servant and businessman
Tom Brennan (footballer), English soccer player
Tom Brennan (ice hockey) (1922–2003), American ice hockey player for Boston Bruins
Tom Brennan (speedway rider) (born 2001), British speedway rider
Thom Brennan (born 1957), American musician
Tommy Brennan, Scottish political activist

See also
Tom Brennan (barge), a 1949 barge used in outback South Australia during flooding of Coppers Creek
Thomas Brannan (1893–1960), English rugby league footballer of the 1910s and 1920s